Swaziland competed in the 2014 Commonwealth Games in Glasgow, Scotland from 23 July to 3 August 2014.

Athletics

Men
Track & road events

Women
Track & road events

Boxing

Men

Cycling

Mountain biking

Road
Men

Women

Judo

Men

Swimming

Men

References

Nations at the 2014 Commonwealth Games
Eswatini at the Commonwealth Games
Com